Chilika Teerey is a 1977 Indian Odia film directed by Biplab Roy Choudhury, story of an oppressed, illiterate fisher-folk, being swindled and kept in check by the business sharks and how they revolt.

Synopsis 
Near Chilika lake, there is a cluster of villages inhabited by fisher-folk. They are exploited by the large fishing companies. Raghu, a revolutionary village youth leads the village to confront the fishing company. One fishing company manager Sricharan tries to demoralise and divide the unity of fisher-folk. But the revolution starts with pace. While Sricharan tries to escape from the scene, the villagers thrown him up in the Chilika lake. Raghu, has a love interest with a village girl Padma, but he is not allowed to marry her as she belongs to another caste. At last, dejected Raghu hands over the revolution torch to Jadu and leaves with Padma rowing through lake Chilika in search of a new world.

Cast 
Bijay Mohanty as Raghu
Tandra Roy as Padma
Netrananda Misra as Sricharan
Hemanta Das as Jadu
Sujata Anand
Ashok
Runu Bose
Akshaya Mohanty Kashyap
Preeti Patnaik
Manju Pradhan
Radharani

Music 
Shantunu Mahapatra has arranged the music for this film.

Awards & Participation 
National Film Awards (1978) - Certificate of merit for best Odia film.

References

External links 
 

1977 films
1970s Odia-language films